Den Ham [dɛn ɦɑm] is a village in the Dutch province of Overijssel. It is located in the municipality of Twenterand, about 15 km northwest of Almelo.

Den Ham was a separate municipality until 2001, when it became a part of Vriezenveen. It was subsequently renamed Twenterand in 2002.

History 
Den Ham is an esdorp which was first mentioned in 1333. During the Dutch Revolt it was under frequent attack. In 1840, it was home to 748 people. It the mid-19th century, it was surpassed by Vroomshoop which had better connections to the outside world. In 1914, the dairy factory De Eensgezindheid opened in Den Ham.

Gallery

References

Municipalities of the Netherlands disestablished in 2001
Populated places in Overijssel
Former municipalities of Overijssel
Salland
Twenterand